Anupama Chopra is an Indian author, journalist, film critic and director of the MAMI Mumbai Film Festival. She is also the founder and editor of the digital platform Film Companion, which offers a curated look at cinema. She has written several books on Indian cinema and has been a film critic for NDTV, India Today, as well as the Hindustan Times. She also hosted a weekly film review show The Front Row With Anupama Chopra, on Star World. She won the 2000 National Film Award for Best Book on Cinema for her first book Sholay: The Making of a Classic. She presently critiques movies and interviews celebrities for Film Companion.

She is the festival director of Mumbai Academy of the Moving Image.

Early life and background 
Born as Anupama Chandra in Calcutta, India to Chandra Parshad family, she has also lived in Badayun, a city in Uttar Pradesh. Her father Navin Chandra was the eldest of the brothers and sisters. Anupama's grandfather, originally from Delhi, was an executive with Union Carbide, Kolkata. Her mother Kamna Chandra was a scriptwriter who wrote dialogue for such films as Prem Rog (1982) and Chandni (1989). Chopra grew up with her brother and sister in Mumbai, where her family lived in Nepean Sea Road and then in Cuffe Parade. Her sister Tanuja Chandra is an Indian Film director and screenwriter; her brother Vikram Chandra is a novelist, who splits his time between California and India. She also lived in Hong Kong for several years as a teenager. She graduated from St. Xavier's College, Mumbai with a BA in English Literature in 1987.

Later, Chopra earned her MA in journalism from Northwestern University's Medill School of Journalism. She won the Harrington Award for "academic excellence and promise for success in the field of magazine journalism" while at Medill. She later said, "Film journalism was untouchable at the time. Everybody was ashamed and nobody wanted to admit that I worked for movies."

Career 
After her education, Chopra started her career as a film journalist and critic and over the years has written several books of films, especially Hindi cinema. She has written about the Hindi film industry since 1993 and has explored cinema in several mediums – print, television and digital. Her first book Sholay: The Making of a Classic (2000) won the 2001 National Film Award for Best Book on Cinema (India). Dilwale Dulhaniya Le Jayenge  (The Bravehearted Will Take The Bride) (2002) was published by the British Film Institute as part of their Modern Classics Series. Her book, King of Bollywood: Shah Rukh Khan and the Seductive World of Indian Cinema, was featured on the annual "Editor's Choice" list of the New York Times Book Review. It was also translated into German, Indonesian and Polish.

Chopra's 2011 book First Day First Show: Writings from the Bollywood Trenches, is a compilation of her articles on Hindi cinema over two decades, published by Penguin India.

Chopra's work has been published in India Today, India's largest English-language magazine. She has also written about Hindi Films for various international publications such as The New York Times, the Los Angeles Times, Variety and Sight & Sound and is currently a contributing editor to Vogue India.

Chopra hosted film review show, Picture This on NDTV 24X7 news channel. In 2012, she started her weekly review show called The Front Row with Anupama Chopra, on Star World, which ran until June 2014.  In 2013, she released two books, Freeze Frame based on the interviews with film makers and actors on the TV show, and 100 Films to See before You Die based on her weekly film columns. In 2014, she also did a Hindi show called 'Star Verdict' on Star Plus. Currently she hosts Film Companion on YouTube which replaced "The Front Row With Anupama Chopra" where she critiques Hindi Film movies. She has written several books on cinema.  Anupama's latest book, The Front Row: Conversations on Cinema published by HarperCollins is a collection of her televised interviews with both Indian Film and Hollywood personalities. She is also actively involved in works related to film festivals happening in India.

In November 2014, Chopra replaced Shyam Benegal to become the chairperson of the Mumbai Film Festival organized by the Mumbai Academy of the Moving Image (MAMI).

Film Companion 
In July 2014, Chopra founded # Film Companion # as a pan-India platform for entertainment journalism. Currently the platform carries reviews, interviews, features and masterclasses around cinema, television and web series. Chopra, Rahul Desai, Sucharita Tyagi and Pratayush Parasuraman write for the platform. Baradwaj Rangan also wrote for many years before leaving on 15 March 2022.

Awards
 2000 National Film Award for Best Book on Cinema for Sholay: The Making of a Classic

Personal life 
Chopra is married to Vidhu Vinod Chopra, a Hindi Film producer and director. Her daughter Zuni Chopra  (born 2001/2002) is author of three books, including a novel and two books in poetry. Her son Agni Dev Chopra is an aspiring cricketer.

Bibliography 
 Sholay: The Making of a Classic. Penguin Books, 2000. .
 Dilwale Dulhania Le Jayenge, British Film Institute, 2002. .
 King of Bollywood: Shah Rukh Khan and the Seductive World of Indian Cinema. Grand Central Publishing, 2007. .
 First Day First Show: Writings from the Bollywood Trenches. Penguin Books India, 2011. .
 Freeze Frames. Om Books, 2013. .
 100 Films to See before You Die. BCCL, New Delhi, 2013. .
 The Front Row: Conversation on Cinema. HarperCollins Publishers India, 2015. .
 In Conversation with the Stars. Rupa Publications, 2019.

References

External links 
Film Companion
Anupama Chopra reviews at Hindustan Times

Indian film critics
Year of birth missing (living people)
Living people
Writers from Kolkata
St. Xavier's College, Mumbai alumni
Medill School of Journalism alumni
Indian women television presenters
Indian television presenters
Indian women television journalists
Indian television journalists
Journalists from West Bengal
Women writers from West Bengal
Indian women critics
20th-century Indian journalists
21st-century Indian journalists
20th-century Indian women writers
21st-century Indian women writers
21st-century Indian writers
Variety (magazine) people